The siege of Havana was a successful British siege against Spanish-ruled Havana that lasted from March to August 1762, as part of the Seven Years' War. After Spain abandoned its former policy of neutrality by signing the family compact with France, resulting in a British declaration of war on Spain in January 1762, the British government decided to mount an attack on the important Spanish fortress and naval base of Havana, with the intention of weakening the Spanish presence in the Caribbean and improving the security of its own North American colonies. A strong British naval force consisting of squadrons from Britain and the West Indies, and the military force of British and American troops it convoyed, were able to approach Havana from a direction that neither the Spanish governor nor the Admiral expected and were able to trap the Spanish fleet in the Havana harbour and land its troops with relatively little resistance.

The Spanish authorities decided on a strategy of delaying the British attack until the strength of the city's defences and the onset of seasonal rains inflicting tropical diseases would significantly reduce the size of the British force via disease, along with the start of hurricane season would force the British fleet to seek a safe anchorage. However, the city's main fortress, the Morro Castle was overlooked by a hill that the governor had neglected to fortify; the British installed batteries there and bombarded the fortress daily with heavy shelling. The fortress eventually fell after the officer in charge of Morro Castle, Luis Vicente de Velasco, was mortally wounded by a stray bullet. The capture of Morro Castle led to the eventual fall of the rest of the fortifications and the surrender of the city, the remaining garrison, and the naval forces present, before the hurricane season began.

The surrender of Havana led to substantial rewards for the British naval and military leaders and smaller amounts of prize money for other officers and men. The Spanish governor, Admiral and other military and civil office holders were court-martialled upon their return to Spain and punished for their failures to conduct a better defence and allowing the Spanish fleet present to fall intact into the hands of the British. Havana remained under British occupation until February 1763, when it was returned to Spain under the 1763 Treaty of Paris that formally ended the war.

Background

Havana in the late 18th century was a major port and naval base, and also the strongest fortress in Spanish America. Its royal shipyard with access to abundant supplies of resistant hardwoods was capable of building first-rate ships of the line and had been developed by the Bourbon monarchy as the most important of its three naval shipyards. There had been several previous plans to attack Havana, including one proposed to Vernon in 1739, which he rejected in favour of an attack on Porto Bello, but no successful attack since it was comprehensively fortified, and the strength of its fortifications and difficulty that large sailing warships would have in making an undetected approach from the north convinced the Spanish commanders it would be virtually impossible to capture, if its fortifications were in good order and it was properly garrisoned. Its wealth and ability to feed its population also suggested that it could resist being starved into surrender.

Britain had been formally at war with France since May 1756, but Spain under Ferdinand VI remained neutral. After Ferdinand's death in 1759, his half-brother Charles III, reversed Ferdinand's policy and, by the Treaty of Paris (1761), re-established the so-called Family Compact between France and Spain. This treaty involved an offensive alliance directed against Britain, and in December 1761, Spain placed an embargo on British trade, seized British goods in Spain and expelled British merchants. In response to this, Britain declared war on Spain in January 1762.

Spanish preparations
Before involving his country in the conflict raging in Europe and across the world, Charles III made provisions to defend the Spanish colonies against the Royal Navy. For the defence of Cuba, he appointed Juan de Prado as Captain General of Cuba, which was an administrative rather than a military position. De Prado arrived at Havana in February 1761 and began construction efforts to improve the fortifications of the city, although the work was incomplete at the time of the siege.

In June 1761, a flotilla of seven ships of the line under the command of Admiral Gutierre de Hevia arrived at Havana, transporting two infantry regiments of regulars (the España and Aragón regiments) totalling 996 men, bringing up the number of the Havana garrison to 2,400 regulars. There were also 6,300 sailors and marines aboard the ships. However, yellow fever had reduced the effective defending forces of the city by the time the siege began to 1,900 regulars, 750 marines, around 5,000 sailors and 2,000 to 3,000 militia, besides several thousand more without muskets or training to operate them. The main garrison consisted of:

 España Infantry Regiment (481 men)
 Aragón Infantry Regiment (265 men)
 Havana Infantry Regiment (856 men)
 Edinburgh's Dragoons (150 men)
 Army gunners (104 men)
 Navy gunners and marines (750 men )

Havana had one of the finest natural harbours in the West Indies with a 180 m wide and 800 m long entrance channel giving access to the harbour. Two strong fortresses defended the entrance channel. On the north side of the channel stood the very strong Castillo de los Tres Reyes del Morro (known in English as Morro Castle) on the rocky Cavannos Ridge. It had 64 artillery pieces and was garrisoned by 700 men. However, it had been noted that most of its guns faced Havana's port and bay, and that it was overlooked by the unfortified hill of La Cabana. Although it had been proposed to fortify La Cabana, the project had been delayed and no guns had been installed there by the start of the siege. The south side was defended by the older Castillo de San Salvador de la Punta. The channel could also be blocked by a boom chain extending from El Morro to La Punta.

British preparations
Two days after the declaration of war with Spain, on the advice of Lord Anson, the British cabinet chose Havana as a major objective in its attack on Spain because of its strategic importance, believing that its permanent loss would weaken Spanish influence in the Caribbean. Detailed plans were made for a combined naval and military attack on Havana, relying on the Royal Navy's superiority in numbers and effectiveness over the Spanish fleet. Vice-Admiral Sir George Pocock, with seven ships-of-the-line and a frigate and Commodore Keppel his second-in-command, was to transport a military force under the command of George Keppel, 3rd Earl of Albemarle to the West Indies, to join the West Indies naval squadron, then under the command of  Rear-Admiral Rodney, who was undertaking operations against Martinique, taking on additional troops there. The fleet was then to proceed to the northwest of Saint-Domingue (present-day Haiti) to embark 4,000 men from the British colonies in North America, commanded by Jeffrey Amherst, and be further reinforced by a squadron from Port Royal, Jamaica, commanded by Sir James Douglas. It was to keep its final destination in doubt until it launched its amphibious attack on Havana.

These plans were modified to meet circumstances, as Rodney and Robert Monckton commanding the troops had captured Martinique before Pocock sailed, 3,000 British and American troops from New York did not arrive at Havana until late July, and the plan to take up to 2,000 slaves from Jamaica to act as pioneers only produced 600 slaves, as many owners were reluctant to part with them without a scheme for compensation. A plan by Amherst to assemble a force of 8,000 men for an attack on Louisiana was dismissed by Albemarle as impractical as it would have left too few troops in the North American colonies.

During the month of February, British troops embarked; they consisted of:
 22nd Regiment of Foot
 34th Regiment of Foot
 56th Regiment of Foot
 72nd Richmond's Regiment of Foot

On 5 March the British expedition sailed from Spithead, England, with 7 ships of the line and 4,365 men aboard 64 transports and shops carrying supplies and artillery.  The fleet arrived in Barbados on 20 April.  Five days later the expedition reached Fort Royal on the recently conquered island of Martinique where it picked up the remainder of Major-General Robert Monckton's expedition, still numbering 8,461 men. Rear Admiral Rodney's squadron, amounting to 8 ships of the line also joined the expedition bringing the total number of ships of the line to 15. There was some friction between Rodney and Pocock, as the latter had been preferred for the naval command of this important expedition. On 23 May the expedition, now off the northwest corner of Saint-Domingue, was further reinforced by Sir James Douglas' squadron from Port Royal, Jamaica. The combined force now amounted to 21 ships of the line, 24 lesser warships, and 168 other vessels, carrying some 14,000 seamen and marines plus another 3,000 hired sailors and 12,826 regulars.

Siege
The normal approach to Havana, on the north coast of Cuba, was to sail west parallel to the south coast of the island on the prevailing south-easterly wind, then to round its western tip and sail east towards Havana, against the wind. This last section, more than 200 miles long, would take a large squadron at least one week, and probably several, to complete, giving ample warning for Havana to prepare. To the north of Havana, reaching as far as the Bahamas, is a wide expanse of shallow water, reefs and small islands or cays, accessible only to small boats except for one deep water channel, the Old Bahama Channel which is only some 10 miles wide at its narrowest. Although the Spanish navigators that charted it thought too dangerous for large warships, it was surveyed by a British frigate, whose captain left parties of his men in the cays to mark the extremities of the channel, allowing the whole fleet to pass through it, safely and undetected.

On 6 June the British force came into sight of Havana. Immediately, 12 British ships of the line were sent to the mouth of the entrance channel to block in the Spanish fleet. After surveying the city's defences, the British planned to begin the operations with the reduction of the Morro fortress, on the north side of the channel, through a formal Vauban-style siege. The commanding position of this fort over the city would then force the Spanish commander to surrender. However, the initial survey had underestimated the strength of the Morro fortress, which was located on a rocky promontory where it was impossible to dig approach trenches and that a large ditch cut into the rock protected the fort on the land side.

Although Prado had received information of the presence of English ships two days before its arrival from a frigate that had escaped from the port of Matanzas, he did not believe that major warships could navigate the Old Bahama Channel. Prado and Admiral Hevia, surprised by the size of the attacking force, adopted a delaying defensive strategy. Prado wrote to the French in Saint-Domingue and to Spain for relief forces to be sent. He also requested reinforcements from Santiago de Cuba, which had the second strongest military force on the island, and although two relief forces set out from the Oriente Province in July, both were delayed by food shortages and high levels of sickness. One turned back and the other was still one day's march from Havana when the city surrendered. Besides hope of a relief force, Prado and the Havana garrison had several advantages. Firstly, the hurricane season would begin in late August, putting the British fleet in danger: the wet weather starting earlier in that month would probably also initiate an outbreak of yellow fever among the besiegers. Secondly, despite some losses from tropical diseases Prado had 1,500 Spanish regular soldiers and some 2,300 colonial militiamen, as well as sailors from the fleet.

There were initially 12 Spanish ships of the line in the harbour, besides two others newly constructed but not manned, and also several smaller warships and around 100 merchant ships. The presence of so many merchant ships dissuaded the council from ordering the Spanish fleet to disrupt the British landings, which was also in accordance with the instructions that Admiral Hevia had received when he left Spain to protect Cuba's commerce The fleet's gunners and marines were sent to garrison the fortresses of Morro and Punta which were placed under the command of naval officers. Most of the shot and powder of the fleet as well as its best guns were also transferred to these two fortresses. Meanwhile, regular troops were assigned to the defence of the city. Prado also ordered all women, children and the old and infirm to leave the city, leaving only men able to bear arms.

The channel entrance was immediately closed with the boom chain. Additionally, three ships of the line (Asia (64), Europa (64) and Neptuno (74)) were selected on account of their poor condition and sunk behind the boom chain. Although this made the remaining Spanish warships unable to leave the harbour, they were clearly outnumbered by the English fleet, and this move made the sailors available to defend the city. Realising the importance of the Morro, the Spanish commanders gave it top priority.

The following day British troops were landed northeast of Havana, and began advancing west the next day. They met a militia party that was easily pushed back. By the end of the day, British infantry had reached the vicinity of Havana.  The defence of the Morro was assigned to Luis Vicente de Velasco e Isla, a naval officer, who immediately took measures to prepare and provision the fortress for a siege.

Siege of El Morro

On 11 June a British party stormed a detached redoubt on the La Cabana heights. Only then did the British command realise how strong the Morro was, surrounded by brushwood and protected by a large ditch. With the arrival of their siege train the next day, the British began erecting batteries among the trees on La Cabana hill overlooking the Morro (some  higher) as well as the city and the bay. Surprisingly, this hill had been left undefended by the Spanish army despite its well-known strategic importance. Charles III of Spain had earlier instructed Prado to fortify this hill, a task that he considered the most urgent of those relating to the fortifications. The task had been started but no guns had been installed.

Two days later a British detachment landed at Torreón de la Chorrera, on the west side of the harbour. Meanwhile, Colonel Patrick Mackellar, an engineer, was overseeing the construction of the siege works against the Morro. Since digging trenches was impossible, he resolved to erect breastworks instead. He planned to mine towards a bastion of the Morro once his siege works would have reached the ditch and to create a runway across this ditch with the rubble produced by his mining activities.

By 22 June, four British batteries totalling twelve heavy guns and 38 mortars opened fire on the Morro from La Cabana. Mackellar gradually advanced his breastworks towards the ditch under cover of these batteries so by the end of the month the British had increased their daily direct hits on the Morro to 500.  Velasco was losing as many as 30 men each day, and the workload of repairing the fortress every night was so exhausting that men had to be rotated into the fort from the city every three days. Velasco finally managed to convince Prado that a raid was necessary against the British batteries. At dawn on 29 June 988 men (a mixed company of grenadiers, marines, engineers, and slaves) attacked the siege works. They reached the British batteries from the rear and started to spike guns, but British reaction was swift, and the attackers were repulsed before they caused any serious damage.

On 1 July, the British launched a combined land and naval attack on the Morro. The fleet detached four ships of the line for this purpose: HMS Stirling Castle, HMS Dragon, HMS Marlborough and HMS Cambridge. The naval and land artillery simultaneously opened fire on the Morro. However, naval guns were ineffective, the fort being located too high. Counter-fire from thirty guns of the Morro inflicted 192 casualties and seriously damaged the ships, one of which was later scuttled, forcing them to withdraw. Meanwhile, the bombardment by the land artillery was far more effective. By the end of the day, only three Spanish guns were still effective on the side of the Morro facing the British batteries. The next day however British breastworks around the Morro caught fire and the batteries were burned down, destroying the product of much of the work undertaken since mid June. Velasco immediately capitalised on this event, remounting many guns and repairing breaches in the fortifications of the Morro.

Since its arrival at Havana, the British army had heavily suffered from malaria and yellow fever and was now at half strength. Since the hurricane season was approaching, Albemarle was now engaged in a race against time. He ordered the batteries to be rebuilt with the help of men of the fleet. Many 32-pounder guns were taken from the lower deck of several ships to equip these new batteries.

By 17 July the new British batteries had progressively silenced most of Velasco's guns, leaving only two of them operational. With the absence of artillery cover, it now became impossible for the Spanish troops to repair the damage being inflicted on the Morro. Mackellar was also able to resume construction of siege works to approach the fortress.
With the army in such a bad condition, work progressed rather slowly. All hope of the British army now resided in the expected arrival of reinforcements from North America.

The progress of siege works over the next few days allowed the British to begin the mining towards the right bastion of the Morro. Meanwhile, the now unopposed British artillery was daily hitting the Morro up to 600 times, causing some sixty casualties. Velasco had now no hope but to destroy British siege works and so on 22 July 1,300 regulars, seamen and militia sallied from Havana in three columns and attacked the siege works surrounding the Morro. The British repelled the Spanish sortie who thus withdrew to their lines and the siege works were left relatively intact.

On 24 July Albemarle offered Velasco the opportunity to surrender, allowing him to write his own terms of capitulation. Velasco answered that the issue would rather be settled by force of arms. Three days later the reinforcements from North America led by Colonel Burton finally arrived. These reinforcements, who had been attacked by the French during their journey, with the loss through capture of some 500 men, consisted of:
 46th Thomas Murray's Regiment of Foot
 58th Anstruther's Regiment of Foot
 American provincials (3,000 men)
 Gorham's and Danks' Rangers – which were combined into a 253-man ranger corps.
By 25th July 5,000 soldiers and 3,000 sailors were sick.

On 29 July the mine near the right bastion of the Morro fort was completed and ready to explode. Albemarle vainly feigned an assault, hoping that Velasco would finally decide to surrender. On the contrary, Velasco decided to launch a desperate attack from the sea upon the British miners in the ditch. At 2:00 am the next day two Spanish schooners attacked the miners from the sea. Their attack was unsuccessful and they had to withdraw. At 1:00 pm the British finally detonated the mine. The debris of the explosion partly filled the ditch but Albemarle judged it passable, and launched an assault, sending 699 picked men against the right bastion. Before the Spanish could react, sixteen men gained a foothold on the bastion. Velasco rushed to the breach with his troops, and was mortally wounded during the ensuing hand-to-hand fighting. The Spanish troops fell back, leaving the British in control of the Morro fort. Velasco was transported back to Havana, but by 31 July had died of his wounds.

The British then occupied a position commanding the city of Havana as well as the bay. Artillery batteries were brought up along the north side of the entrance channel from the Morro fort to La Cabana hill, where they could be trained directly on the town.

Surrender
On 11 August, after Prado had rejected the demand for surrender sent to him by Albemarle, the British batteries opened fire on Havana. A total of 47 guns (15 × 32-pdrs, 32 × 24-pdrs), 10 mortars and 5 howitzers pounded the city from a distance of 500–800 m. By the end of the day Fort la Punta was silenced. Prado had no other choice left but to surrender.

The next day, Prado was informed that there was only sufficient ammunition for a few more days. He made belated plans to remove the bullion in Havana to another part of the island, but the city was surrounded.  Negotiations of the articles of capitulation of the city and the fleet went on, and Prado and his army obtained the honours of war on 13 August. Hevia neglected to burn his fleet which fell intact in the hands of the British.

The great losses of men in the attack on Havana put to an end any possibility of an attack on Louisiana, and the French took advantage of the removal of so many troops from Canada to capture Newfoundland with a small force of fifteen hundred troops. Newfoundland was recaptured in the Battle of Signal Hill on September 15, 1762.

Aftermath

On 14 August the British entered the city. They had obtained possession of the most important harbour in the Spanish West Indies along with military equipment, 1,828,116 Spanish pesos and merchandise valued around 1,000,000 Spanish pesos. Furthermore, they had seized nine ships of the line in Havana harbour, representing one-fifth of the strength of the Spanish Navy, namely Aquilón (74), Conquistador (74), Reina (70), San Antonio (64), Tigre (70), San Jenaro (60), América (60), Infante (74) and Soberano (74), together with a ship of 78 guns belonging  to the Compañía de La Habana, a number of smaller armed vessels belonging to it and the Compañía de Caracas and nearly 100 merchant ships. Two new almost-completed ships of the line in the dockyard, the San Carlos (80) and Santiago (80), were burnt. In addition, two small frigates or corvettes and two 18-gun sloops, including the Marte commanded by Domingo de Bonechea, and several smaller vessels were captured either along the Cuban coast or in Havana harbour.

After the capture, Prize money payments of £122,697 each were made to Pocock as naval commander and to Albemarle as military commander, with £24,539 paid to Commodore Keppel, the naval second-in-command who was Albemarle's younger brother. Each of the 42 naval captains present received £1,600 as prize money. The military second-in-command,  Lieutenant-General Eliott, received the same amount as Commodore Keppel, as the two shared a fifteenth part of the prize pool, as against the third shared by their commanders. Elliot was able to buy Bayley Park in East Sussex which he altered and enlarged. Privates in the army received just over £4 and ordinary seamen rather less than £4 each.

During the siege the British had lost 2,764 killed, wounded, captured or deserted, but by 18 October also had lost 4,708 dead from sickness. One of the most depleted brigades was transferred to North America where it lost a further 360 men within a month of arrival. Three ships of the line were lost either as a direct result of Spanish gunfire or severe damage received which would cause their demise later. Shortly after the siege  was declared unserviceable and was stripped and scuttled.

Charles III appointed a commission of generals to try Prado and others considered culpable for the loss of Havana on their return to Spain. Prado, Hevia and nine other military and civil officials were accused of treason and their trial was, in effect, a court martial, although it examined their actions during Prado's governorship as well as tactical decisions taken during the siege and although Prado and several officials were not military officers. The commission placed most of the blame on Prado and Hevia, finding them to have failed to fortify the Cabana hill properly and to have abandoned it too easily; to have crippled the Spanish fleet by sinking blockships that prevented the remainder taking action against the British and surrendered them intact rather than burning them; they had not mounted any significant counterattacks and, finally, had not removed the royal treasury before the surrender. After a lengthy trial, Prado was found guilty and sentenced to death, but was reprieved and died in prison. Hevia was sentenced to 10 years' house arrest and the loss of his office and titles, but was later pardoned and reinstated: a leading official, Julián de Arriaga, was dismissed from office. Velasco's family was ennobled and his son was created Marqués de Velasco del Morro, and Charles III decreed that there should thereafter be a ship named Velasco in the Spanish fleet. The loss of Havana and Western Cuba was a serious blow to Spain. Not only were the financial losses considerable; the loss in prestige was even greater. This defeat, together with the conquest of Manila by the British one and a half months later, meant the loss of Spain's 'Key to the New World and Rampart of the West Indies' as well as its colonial capital of the Spanish East Indies. These events confirmed British naval supremacy and showed the fragility of the Spanish Empire. Just as the earlier War of Jenkins' Ear had forced the British government into a thorough review of its military, this war forced the Spanish government into undertaking a similar process. The invasions of Havana and Manila were the catalyst for profound political and military reforms in the Spanish overseas empire.

It was clear to the Spanish authorities that their regular army in Cuba could not match the strength that the British army in America could concentrate against it. It was therefore necessary to form a disciplined colonial militia, with adequate weapons and training, supervised by experienced officers and non-commissioned officers,  with an organisation and uniforms similar to the regulars. The regular garrison of about 3,200 would be backed by a disciplined militia of eight infantry battalions and one regiment each of cavalry and dragoons, totaling 7,500 soldiers, with many of the officers from prominent Cuban families. Havana and Manila were returned to Spain as a result of the Treaty of Paris signed in February 1763, but the British occupation lasted until two months later, when a newly appointed  Captain General of Cuba, Alejandro O'Reilly, arrived to re-establish Spanish rule. Spain agreed to cede Florida and Menorca to Great Britain. The loss of Florida and the Spanish acceptance of British occupation of the  Miskito Coast heightened Cuba's value as the first line of defence for the Spanish South American colonies.  Spain received French Louisiana as a payment for intervening in the war on the side of the French and as compensation for having lost Florida.

Gallery
Numerous paintings and drawings of the battle were made, notably by Dominic Serres:

See also
 Great Britain in the Seven Years War
 British occupation of Manila

References

Sources
 
 
 Clowes, W. L. (1898). The Royal Navy: A History from the Earliest Time to the Present, Vol. III, Sampson Low, Marston and Company, London.
 Corbett, J.S, (1907). England in the Seven Years' War: A Study in Combined Strategy, Vol II, Longmans, Green and Co| location = New York
 Danley, Mark and Speelman, Patrick (2012). The Seven Years' War: Global Views, Brill, Leiden. 
 Diefendorf, Jeffry M. and Dorsey, K. (2006). City, country, empire: landscapes in environmental history. Univ of Pittsburgh Press. 
 Fortescue, J. W. (1899), A History of the British Army Vol. II, MacMillan, London.
 Greentree, David (2010). A Far-Flung Gamble, Havana 1762; Osprey Raid Series #15, Osprey Publishing. 
 
 José Guiteras, Pedro (1856). Historia de la conquista de la Habana. (1762), Perry and McMillan, Philadelphia.
 La toma de La Habana por los ingleses (Spanish)
 Kuethe, Alan (1981). The Development of the Cuban Military As a Sociopolitical Elite, 1763–83. The Hispanic American Historical Review, Vol. 61, No. 4, pp. 695–704
 Lavery, Brian (2003). The Ship of the Line – Volume 1: The development of the battlefleet 1650–1850. Conway Maritime Press. .
 Marley, David (1998). Wars of the Americas: a chronology of armed conflict in the New World, 1492 to the present. ABC-CLIO. 
 Pocock, Tom (1998). Battle for Empire: The very first world war 1756–63. Michael O'Mara Books Ltd. .
 
 
 Syrett, David, (1970) The Siege and Capture of Havana, 1762 Navy Records Society.
 Thomas, Hugh, (2013). Cuba: A History. Penguin.

Further reading
 
 Pezuela y Lobo, Jacobo de (1859) Sitio y rendición de la Habana en 1762: Fragmento de la historia inédita de la isla de Cuba, M. Rivadeneyra, Madrid.
 Sanchez-Galarraga, Jorge, "Luis de Velasco — Siege of Havana, 1762", Seven Years War Association Journal Vol. XII No. 2
 

Havana
Seven Years' War
Havana (1762)
Havana (1762)
1762 in Cuba
Spanish colonial period of Cuba
History of Havana
Havana
Anglo-Spanish War (1762–1763)
Havana 1762
Havana 1762